No Place to Hide is a 1993 American detective film written and directed by Richard Danus and starring Kris Kristofferson.

Cast
 Kris Kristofferson as Joe Garvey 
 Drew Barrymore as Tinsel Hanley/Narrator 
 Martin Landau as Frank McCoy
 Illana Diamant as Joline 
 O. J. Simpson as Allie Wheeler
 Dey Young as Karen
 Bruce Weitz as Captain Nelson Silva
 Seth Marten as Harold Rosen
 Lydie Denier as Pamela Hanley 
 Kane Hodder as Weller
 Lilyan Chauvin as Mother Superior

Reception
The film was widely panned by critics, particularly Richard Harrington of the Washington Post: "No Place to Hide is so bad it's not even any good. No guilty pleasures are to be found in its preposterously clumsy plot, or in the limp performance of Kris Kristofferson; someone check his pulse. Even Drew Barrymore regresses from the promise of Guncrazy by being forced to play a petulant 14-year-old caught up in a web of murder and intrigue. For both actors, this film is a triumph of underachievement...The laconic Kristofferson's acting range is measured between squinting eyes and a grinding jaw...The gradually-developing bond between Kris and Drew is excruciatingly detailed in the latter's voiced-over diary entries. It's all very embarrassing...Director Richard Danus, who beats his own script to a pulp, has no idea where to take any of this; loose plot threads abound. The inevitable revelation of a secret society run by Dirty Harry-type elitists is simply ridiculous; if ever a film needed a Satanic subplot, it's this one. In any number of confrontations with Drew's would-be-killer (who looks and acts suspiciously like The Shadow), Kristofferson tells Barrymore to 'Run, run...! Get out of here!' Take those as subliminal messages."

To this day, Kristofferson and Landau are, apparently, not fans of the film themselves. Once, when asked about the picture by a fan, Landau's retort was "Why would you want to know about that one?" For his part, Kristofferson often pretends not to even remember making the film.

References

External links

1993 films
1990s crime films
American crime films
American detective films
1993 directorial debut films
Golan-Globus films
Films scored by Robert O. Ragland
1990s English-language films
1990s American films